Kenny van der Weg (born 19 February 1991) is a Dutch footballer who plays as a centre back for RBC Roosendaal.

Career
Van der Weg has previously played for NAC Breda in the Dutch leagues, and for Ross County in the Scottish Premiership. Ross County released him from his contract on 31 January 2018, and he signed with Hamilton Academical on 12 February.

He signed for Belgian club Roeselare in June 2018. After six months in Belgium, van der Weg returned to Ross County in January 2019, but left seven months later to return to the Netherlands to be with his family. On 11 September 2019 he signed for Norwegian side Aalesund. Without even practicing with the club, his contract was terminated in mid-November 2019. On 30 January 2020, he joined TOP Oss, but left the club again at the end of the season as a free agent, without having made any appearances.

Career statistics

Honours
Ross County
Scottish Championship: 2018–19
Scottish Challenge Cup: 2018–19

References

External links
 Voetbal International profile 
 
 

1991 births
Living people
Dutch footballers
Association football defenders
Footballers from Rotterdam
Dutch expatriate footballers
Eredivisie players
Eerste Divisie players
Scottish Professional Football League players
Challenger Pro League players
NAC Breda players
Ross County F.C. players
Hamilton Academical F.C. players
K.S.V. Roeselare players
Aalesunds FK players
TOP Oss players
Dutch expatriate sportspeople in Belgium
Expatriate footballers in Belgium
Dutch expatriate sportspeople in Scotland
Expatriate footballers in Scotland
Dutch expatriate sportspeople in Norway
Expatriate footballers in Norway